Fetească regală is a white grape variety, was identified around 1920 in Daneș, in Mureș County, Romania. It is a natural crossing of Grasă and Fetească albă. 

This variety is cultivated mainly in Romania (Transylvania, Western Moldavia), as well as in Moldova, Slovakia, Hungary and Austria.

The quality of wines ranges between table wine and high-quality ones. The wines are dry and fresh and have acidity and specific flavour.

Synonyms
Fetească Regală is also known under the synonyms Danasana, Danesana, Danosi, Danosi Leányka, Dunesdorfer Königsast, Dunesdörfer Königsast, Dunnesdiorfer, Erdei Sárga, Feteasca Corolevscaia, Feteasca de Danes, Feteasca Korolevskaia, Feteasca Muscatnaia, Feteasca Muskatnaia, Feteasca Regola, Galbena de Ardeal, Galbena di Ardeal, Kenigrast, Kiraileanka, Királyleányka, Königliche Mädchentraube, Königsast, Königstochter, Konigsast, Kralovska Leanka, Pesecka Leanka.

See also
 Fetească (disambiguation)
 Romanian wine

References

White wine grape varieties
Grape varieties of Romania
Moldovan wine
Hungarian wine